The Società per le strade ferrate dell'Alta Italia  (Upper Italian Railways, SFAI) was an Italian railway company from 1865 to 1885.

History
At its establishment, it included the Turin–Genoa, the Fréjus line, the Turin–Milan, Milan–Chiasso, Milan–Domodossola, Milan–Bologna and the Bologna–Pistoia lines. After Austria's defeat in the Third Italian War of Independence in 1866, the railways of the Veneto (amounting to ), including the Milan–Venice line, were transferred to the SFAI. On 1 July 1885 its network was taken over by the Rete Mediterranea (Mediterranean Network) and the Rete Adriatica (Adriatic Network), with lines generally west of Milan going to the Rete Mediterranea.

SFAI locomotives

The following list is incomplete.

References

External links

Defunct railway companies of Italy